The Grande Rivière de Jacmel or Rivière de la Cosse, is a river in Haiti. It is approximately 45 kilometers long.

See also
List of rivers of Haiti

References
GEOnet Names Server

Rivers of Haiti